The Sangdong mine located in South Korea is one of the largest tungsten mines in the world. The mine is located 187 km southeast of Seoul, approximately three hours’ drive via expressways and local sealed high ways. Temperatures rise to a maximum of about 30℃ during the wet summer months of June to August. The winter period is relatively dry and extends from October to March, with freezing temperatures occurring during the period December to March.

Sangdong Mine had been a main business station for tungsten concentrate production of Korea Tungsten Mining Co.Ltd ("KTMC") with large scale and high quality of Sangdong tungsten production (the principal potential products were tungsten and molybdenum) that was the driving force of South Korean economic development since post-Korean War. At the time of exporting of Sangdong tungsten products to USA in 1947, the institute of analysis and research in USA announced "Korean tungsten quality is outstanding and it is the global standard in the tungsten market".

After a decade from mine closure of KTMC in 1994, mining rights of Sangdong mine were acquired by Woulfe Mining Corporation via Sewoo Mining Corporation in 2006 and established its wholly owned subsidiary, Almonty Korea Tungsten Corporation (ex-Sangdong Mining Corporation). Almonty Industries, specializing in tungsten projects with operation mine in Spain, Australia and Portugal, completes the acquisition of Woulfe Mining Corporation in September 2015. All information and data along with many detail investigation and analysis about Sangdong mine which had been closed for over 15 years were well organized and summarized in the "Feasibility study" and "NI 43-101 Technical report" drawn up by Almonty Industries.

History 
The discovery of first outcrop of Sangdong Mine was in April 1916. Tungsten mineral had increased in value with the outbreak of World War I and had been developed and mined by Japanese mining company (Solim Mining Corporation) until Korean independence in 1945. And in the post-Korean War decades, Sangdong mine was the powerhouse of the economy contributing more than 50% of the country's export revenue as one of the largest global tungsten producer. But as all other metallic mine in South Korea, Sangdong Mine also fell into the way of closing primarily due to low commodity prices along with China’s market open policy in 1980s and so closed in 1994.

1916–1994

2001–2015

Geology
In the perspective of regional geology, the Korean Peninsula is on the eastern margins of the North China-Korea platform underlaid by three blocks of Archean age; the Nangrim-Pyeongnam Block, the Gyeonggi and Yeongnam Massifs which are separated by the northeast-southwest direction Imjingang and the Okcheon belts of Phanerozoic age. The Sangdong mine is situated in the northeast part of the Okcheon Belt.

The lithology of Sangdong can be divided into three main zones such as the Pungcheon Formation of The Great Limestone, the Myobong Formation and the Jangsan Quartize from the upper and the lower in the cross-sectional diagram. The Sangdong Mine contains a skarn-type deposit with altered horizons of the Cambrian-age Myobong Formation. The metamorphosed strata include a biotite granite unit located at a depth of 700m which was intersected during exploratory drilling at 700m below. There is the Jangsan quartzite unit in the lower most area underneath the Myobong unit. The Great Limestone unit completes the series of altered horizons overlying the Myobong Formation. There are certain terms on the horizons such as the Hanging Wall, Main, and Footwall horizons based on its geological features from the uppermost to lowermost regions. The mineralised zone strikes east-west direction and dips to the north at between 15° and 30° with extensions of 1.3 km and 1.5 km.

References

External links 
 Almonty Industries Official Website
 EDISON Investment Research Report – Almonty 
 IntelRadio with Ellis Martin - Almonty Industries’ Lewis Black on being the leaders in tungsten

Tungsten mines in South Korea